Zanetto is a given name. Notable people with the name include:

Zanetto Bugatto (1433–1476), Italian portraitist
Zanetto Micheli (1489–after 1560), Italian string instrument maker

Masculine given names